The Sukhaya is a river in the north of the Kola Peninsula in Murmansk Oblast, Russia. The Sukhaya originates on the Keivy and flows into the Iokanga. Its biggest tributary is the Zolotaya.

References

Rivers of Murmansk Oblast
Tributaries of the Iokanga